60th Brigade may refer to:

 60th Mixed Brigade of the Spanish Republican Army
 60th Brigade (United Kingdom)
 60th Indian Infantry Brigade of the British Indian Army in the First World War
 60th Motorized Infantry Brigade (People's Republic of China)

See also

 60th Division (disambiguation)
 60th Regiment (disambiguation)